Stanley Fields may refer to:

 Stanley Fields (biologist) (born 1955), American biologist 
 Stanley Fields (actor) (1883–1941), American actor
 Stanley Fields (soldier) (born c. 1919), Canadian Second World War soldier made a knight of the Légion d'Honneur - see List of foreign recipients of the Légion d'Honneur
Stan Fields, a character in the film Miss Congeniality